The 2013 FKF Division One was the second season of FKF Division One and the Golden Jubilee second division season since it began in 1963. It began on 23 March and concluded on 21 December.

On 12 April, Murang'a United were suspended from participating in the league any further for the rest of the 2013 season and relegated to the Provincial League for missing three consecutive league games, against Brighter Stars, Maweni City and Kenya Revenue Authority. They were only allowed to participate in the Provincial League from the beginning of the 2014 season, and would not be replaced by any other team during the course of the season. As a result, all their results were nullified.

On 25 April, the Football Kenya Federation initially decided to slash the league to 20 teams for the 2014 season. For that to happen, it was decided that the league will consist of top 5 teams in each zone (except the two teams that win the promotion play-offs) in addition to the two relegated Premier League teams. The remaining 28 teams will be relegated to FKF Division Two, which will begin next season, along with the 8 teams promoted from the Provincial League. However, due to the creation of the Kenyan National Super League on 10 July, it was decided that top 5 teams in each zone (except the two teams that win the promotion play-offs) would be promoted to the new league along with the two relegated Premier League teams, while the remaining 28 teams along with 12 teams promoted from the Provincial League would form the new FKF Division One, which is to be the third-tier league from the beginning of the 2014 season.

Changes from last season
For this season, all Division One teams endorsed a decision to split both Zone A and Zone B into two groups of 12 teams each, increasing the total number of teams in the league to 48. It was decided that the first group from Zone A comprise teams from the Nairobi, Aberdares and Mount Kenya regions while the second group comprise teams from the Eastern, North and South Coast regions. The first group from Zone B is to comprise teams from the South Nyanza, Central and South Rift regions while the second group comprise teams from the North Nyanza, North Rift and Western regions. In the league phase, teams are to play each other only one and winners from each of the four groups will play the winners from the other group in their zone in a two-legged play-off tie to determine who gains promotion to the Kenyan Premier League for the following season.

Outgrowers, who were to be relegated after finishing in 18th place in Zone B the previous season, were readmitted for reasons unknown.

From Division One
Eliminated from football league system
 Mathare Youth (disbanded)

Promoted to Premier League
 Bandari
 Kakamega Homeboyz

Relegated to Provincial League
 Gatundu Stars
 H.B.C. Mlimani
 Iron Strikers
 Karungu
 KSL Thola Glass
 Yanga

To Division One
Relegated from Premier League
 Oserian
 Rangers

Promoted from Provincial League
 Brighter Stars
 Hotsprings FC
 Jericho AllStars
 Kambakia Christian Centre
 Kisero
 Kisumu Youth Olympic Centre
 Kolongolo
 Maweni City
 Mount Kenya United
 Mumcop
 Murang'a United
 Nakumatt
 Raiders
 St. Joseph
 Suam Orchards
 Tala

Introduced to football league system
 FC Talanta

Team name changes
 Congo JMJ United to FC West Ham United
 Kisumu Youth Olympic Centre to Field Negroes
 Maweni City to Alaskan
 Nakuru AllStars to Top Fry AllStars
 Outgrowers to Busia United Stars
 Raiders to Gusii Raiders
 Rangers to Posta Rangers
 Rush to Kakamega Stars to Vihiga Stars
 Tala to Mumbi Nationale

Teams

Stadia and locations

Zone A locations
Zone A clubs are from the Nairobi, Central, Eastern and Coast provinces.

Zone A - Group 1 locations

Zone A - Group 2 locations

Zone B locations
Zone B teams are from the Western, Nyanza and Rift Valley provinces.

Zone B - Group 1 locations

Zone B - Group 2 locations

Managerial changes
As of 19:24, 5 May 2013 (UTC+3).

League tables and results

Zone A

Zone A - Group 1

Zone A - Group 2

Zone B

Zone B - Group 1

Zone B - Group 2

Top scorers

Zone A

Group 1

Last updated: 10 November 2013

Group 2

Last updated: 16 November 2013

Zone B

Group 1

Last updated: 3 November 2013

Group 2

Last updated: 2 November 2013

Promotion play-offs
The promotion play-offs were contested between the winners of each of the 2 groups in both zones, to determine the winners of the zones, who would be consequently promoted to the Premier League. The losers would still gain promotion to the National Super League.

Zone A playoffs

Zone B playoffs

References

2
2013
Kenyan
Kenyan